Montgomeryshire ( meaning "the Shire of Baldwin's town") is one of thirteen historic counties and a former administrative county of Wales.  It is named after its county town, Montgomery, which in turn is named after one of William the Conqueror's main counsellors, Roger de Montgomerie, who was the 1st Earl of Shrewsbury.

Montgomeryshire today constitutes the northern part of the principal area of Powys. The population of Montgomeryshire was 63,779 according to the 2011 census, with a low population density of just 75 people per square mile (29 people per square km). The current area is 2,174 square km (839 square miles).

The largest town is Newtown, followed by Welshpool and Llanidloes.

History

The Treaty of Montgomery was signed on 29 September 1267, in the town of Montgomery, which had recently been established as an English incursion on the Welsh side of the border, to control a strategic border crossing. The surrounding region (on the Welsh side of the border) otherwise comprised the mediaeval principality of Powys Wenwynwyn, the southern of the two states into which the Kingdom of Powys had been divided a century before.

Attacks by Gwynedd on Powys Wenwynwyn led the latter to seek the assistance of the English. Ultimately this led them to convert their territory into a marcher lordship, via surrender and regrant, as a way to strengthen their position; the ruling princes of Powys Wenwynwyn became the Lords of Powys, feudally bound to the English king, and able to fully rely on English backing, but otherwise independent. The prince took an English-style surname - Owen de-la Pole - after his capital city, Pool (now Welshpool).

With the introduction of the Laws in Wales Acts 1535–1542 the marcher lordships were converted into English counties. The Lordship of Powys – the former Powys Wenwynwyn – became Montgomeryshire; the county town being Montgomery, the strongest centre of English authority in the region, rather than centre of Welsh authority, Welshpool. Montgomeryshire was thus ultimately formed from the cantrefi of Powys Wenwynwyn:
 Y Fyrnwy (commotes of Mochnant Uwch Rhaeadr, Mechain Is Coed and Llanerch Hudol)
 Llyswynaf (commotes of Caereinion and Mechain Uwch Coed)
 Ystlyg (commotes of Deuddwr, Ystrad Marchell and Y Gorddwr Isaf)
 Cedewain (commotes of Cynan, Cyfeiliog and Mawddwy)
 Arwystli (commotes of Arwystli Is Coed and Arwystli Uwch Coed)

In addition, for practical reasons, Montgomeryshire gained the commote of Ceri, which had formed a northwards spur of the less organised region Between Wye and Severn; most of the rest of the latter region became Radnorshire.

Montgomeryshire was bordered, to the north, by Denbighshire, to the east and south east by Shropshire, to the south by Radnorshire, to the south west by Cardiganshire, and to the west and north west by Merionethshire. When, in subsequent centuries, the concept of Wales was once again officially distinguished from England, all of these counties were deemed Welsh, except for Shropshire.
Montgomeryshire was the birthplace of Welsh Catholic martyr Saint Richard Gwyn (in 1537).

Local government

Elected county councils were established in 1889 under the Local Government Act 1888 to take over the local government functions previously exercised by the quarter sessions. Although the county was named after Montgomery, by 1889 the quarter sessions were instead held at both Newtown and Welshpool, and the new county council chose to continue meeting in both towns in its early years. Montgomeryshire County Council held its first formal meeting on 1 April 1889 at the Public Rooms (also known as the Flannel Exchange) in Newtown.

In 1931 the county council opened a new headquarters building in Welshpool, called the Montgomeryshire County Offices or Neuadd Maldwyn. The county council remained based at Neuadd Maldwyn until its abolition in 1974.

Local government reforms in 1974 combined the administrative areas of Montgomeryshire, Radnorshire and Brecknockshire together to form a new administrative county called Powys. A new district of Montgomeryshire was established as a lower-tier district authority within Powys, with the district's area matching the former administrative county. The district council took over Neuadd Maldwyn in Welshpool to serve as its headquarters, and also retained the former offices of the abolished Newtown and Llanllwchaiarn Urban District Council at Newtown Hall Park as an area office.

Further local government reform in 1996 abolished district councils in Wales, making Powys a unitary authority. From 1996 until 2018 Powys County Council had a Montgomeryshire area committee covering the former Montgomeryshire district plus three communities formerly in the Glyndŵr district of Clwyd (historically Denbighshire) which were transferred to Powys in 1996. The three area committees for the former counties were abolished in 2018.

Electoral representation
Montgomeryshire is a UK Parliament constituency and a Senedd constituency.

Geography
The shire is almost wholly mountainous, although there are some fertile valleys in the east. Its main rivers are the River Severn (which flows east into Shropshire) and the River Dyfi (which flows west into the Irish Sea). Lake Vyrnwy is a reservoir supplying Liverpool.

The main towns are Machynlleth, Llanidloes, Montgomery, Newtown and Welshpool. The main industries are agriculture (mainly hill farming) and tourism, though there is also some forestry and light manufacturing. The population density is highest near the border with England and along the Severn valley. The county is closely linked to Shropshire, with many essential services for Montgomeryshire residents being located in the more densely populated town of Shrewsbury, such as acute health services at the Royal Shrewsbury Hospital.

The county flower of Montgomeryshire is Spergula arvensis (also called "corn spurrey"). The shire forms a vice-county for wildlife recording.

Transport
Montgomeryshire is crossed from East to West by the Cambrian Line, a mainline passenger railway which runs between Shrewsbury and Aberystwyth as well as Pwllheli with stations at Welshpool, Newtown, Caersws and Machynlleth. As of 2018 services are provided by Transport for Wales.

The Welshpool and Llanfair Light Railway links Welshpool to Llanfair Caereinion.

Places of special interest
Bryntail lead mine buildings near Llanidloes
Centre for Alternative Technology at Llwyngwern near Machynlleth
The Museum of Modern Art, Wales (MOMA) in Machynlleth
Dolforwyn Castle near Abermule
Montgomery Castle in Montgomery
The Old Bell Museum in Montgomery
Powis Castle near Welshpool
 The Robert Owen Museum in Newtown
Trefeglwys Tumuli
Mathrafal — the seat of the Welsh kings and princes of Powys
Meifod
Offa's Dyke

Politics 
Montgomeryshire is represented in the following constituencies:

 Montgomeryshire (UK Parliament constituency), a constituency of the House of Commons of the Parliament of the United Kingdom

See also
Townships in Montgomeryshire
Local government in Wales
History of Wales
History of local government in Wales
List of Lord Lieutenants of Montgomeryshire
List of High Sheriffs of Montgomeryshire

References

External links
Map of Montgomeryshire on Wikishire

 
Historic counties of Wales
States and territories established in 1535
1535 establishments in England